Angelique Kerber defeated Karolína Plíšková in the final, 6–3, 4–6, 6–4 to win the women's singles tennis title at the 2016 US Open. It was her second major singles title. Kerber became the first player since Martina Hingis in 1997 to win both hard court majors in the same calendar year, having also won the Australian Open. She also attained the world No. 1 ranking for the first time after Serena Williams failed to reach the final. In addition to Kerber and Williams, Garbiñe Muguruza and Agnieszka Radwańska were in contention for the top ranking.

Flavia Pennetta was the reigning champion, but retired from the sport at the end of 2015.

Plíšková became the first Czech woman to reach the final since 1993, and only the fourth player to beat both of the Williams sisters in the same major (defeating Venus Williams in the fourth round and Serena Williams in the semifinals).

Serena Williams was attempting to set new Open Era records by winning a 23rd major singles title and a seventh US Open singles title, but she lost in the semifinals to Plíšková.

This marked the last professional appearance for former world No. 1 and 2008 French Open champion Ana Ivanovic, who lost to Denisa Allertová in the first round. She announced her retirement prior to the 2017 season due to ongoing injuries.

Ana Konjuh became the first Croatian woman to reach the US Open singles quarterfinal.

This was Venus Williams' 72nd main draw major appearance, surpassing the all-time record previously held by Amy Frazier.

Seeds

Qualifying

Draw

Finals

Top half

Section 1

Section 2

Section 3

Section 4

Bottom half

Section 5

Section 6

Section 7

Section 8

Championship match statistics

Seeded players
The following are the seeded players. Seedings are based on WTA rankings on August 22, 2016. Rank and points before are as of August 29, 2016.

Withdrawn players
The following players would have been seeded, but they withdrew or not entered from the event.

Other entry information

Wild cards

Protected ranking

Qualifiers

Lucky loser
  Alison Van Uytvanck

Withdrawals
 Before the tournament

 – Not included on entry list& – Withdrew from entry list

Retirements

Notes

References

External links
 Women's Singles main draw
 2016 US Open – Women's draws and results at the International Tennis Federation

Women's Singles
US Open - Women's Singles
US Open (tennis) by year – Women's singles
2016 in women's tennis
2016 in American women's sports